Tenke is a town in the Lualaba province of the Democratic Republic of the Congo.

Economy 

The main economic activity of the city is mining, mainly from the Tenke Fungurume Mine.

Another important economic activity is logistics services.

Transport

Road
The city is crossed by Transafican Highway 9 (TAH 9), which connects it to the cities of Likasi and Kolwezi.

Rail
It is the junction of the national railway network of Congo, connecting the Benguela railway to the Cape to Cairo Railway.

See also 

 Railway stations in DRCongo

References 

Populated places in Lualaba Province